Tobias "Tobi" Delbrück (often written Delbruck) (born 1960, Pasadena, California) is an American neuromorphic engineer at the University of Zurich and ETH Zurich, Switzerland. He was named Fellow of the Institute of Electrical and Electronics Engineers (IEEE) in 2014 "for contributions to neuromorphic visual sensors and processing".

Family and education
Tobi is the son of Mary Adeline Bruce and Max Delbrück, the 1969 Nobel laureate in Physiology or Medicine. Delbrück has a Bachelor's degree in physics and applied mathematics from the University of California, San Diego and obtained a PhD in computation and neural systems at Caltech in 1993 under the guidance of Carver Mead.

References 

1960 births
Living people
American bioengineers
American computer scientists
American neuroscientists 
American expatriates in Switzerland
Fellow Members of the IEEE
Academic staff of ETH Zurich
Academic staff of the University of Zurich
California Institute of Technology alumni
University of California, San Diego alumni
People from Pasadena, California